Tekağaç is a village in the Nusaybin District of Mardin Province in Turkey. The village is populated by Kurds of the Dasikan tribe and had a population of 23 in 2022.

The village was unpopulated between 2007 and 2021.

References 

Villages in Nusaybin District
Kurdish settlements in Mardin Province